Ahmad Abdulaziz Abdullah A. (born 1984), better known as Abu Walaa, is an Islamic preacher based in Hildesheim, Germany. In 2016 he was arrested for supporting terrorism.

Biography

Born in al-Tamim, Iraq, he immigrated to Germany in 2001. He preached at the Deutschsprachiger Islamkreis Hildesheim e. V. (DIK) mosque founded in 2012, and took part as a speaker in a great number of Salafi events due to his popularity through his online video releases and his Facebook followers. He became known as a "preacher without face", because in many of his videos, his face would be hidden from the camera.

Arrest
On the morning of November 8, 2016, the German police arrested Abu Walaa in Bad Salzdetfurth alongside four suspected accomplices in Hildesheim and North Rhine-Westphalia accused of supporting a foreign terrorist organization according to article 129b of the German Penal Code.

He is suspected of being the head of an Islamic group, recruiting young Muslims in Germany to fight for jihad in Syria and Iraq for the Islamic State of Iraq and the Levant (ISIL or ISIS). The German authorities had long been investigating his activities. Based on testimony by Turkish-German Anil O., a young man fighting in Syria and arrested upon his return to Germany, the German prosecutor's office demanded Abu Walaa's arrest after Anil O. admitted he was influenced by Abu Walaa at his Hildesheim mosque for jihad.

Conviction 
Abu Walaa was convicted of support and membership in a terrorist organisation on 24 February 2021 by the Oberlandesgericht in Celle. He was sentenced to 10,5 years in prison.

References

1984 births
Living people
People from Hildesheim
Iraqi emigrants to Germany
Islamic State of Iraq and the Levant and Germany
Islamic terrorism in Germany